Kichhhu Sanlap Kichhu Pralap is a 1999 Indian Bengali drama film directed and produced by Ashoke Viswanathan, starting Ashoke Viswanathan, Sanjiban Guha and Nandini Ghosal in the lead roles. Screenplay written by Ashoke Viswanathan collaboratively with Shankar Bhaterjee, Prhalad Chattopadhay and Mrinmoy nandi.

The film is mostly based on Kolkata's gossip in Indian Coffee House of College Street, the relationship between two young couple and outside the film will probably appeal to communists and the intellectuals of Kolkata city in that time.

The film was generally received well by critics and won Indian Panorama at IFFI (1999) and National Film Awards (1999).

Cast

 N. Viswanathan
 Sanjiban Guha as Newton
 Nandini Ghosal as Ananya
 Ashoke Viswanathan as Arup, narrator
 Tamal Ray Chowdhury
 Shyamal Bhattacharya
 Biswajit Chakraborty
 Amal Kar
 Sheo Kumar Jhunjhunwala
 Gautam Chattopadhyay
 Sumit Ghoshal
 Swaraj Chatterjee
 Pilu Bhattacharya
 Sankar Ghosh
 Gautam Mukherjee
 Shayamal Sengupta
 Shankar Bhattacharjee
 Goutam Sen
 Shyamal Sarkar
 Kunal Bhattacharjee
 Subhash Sarkar
 Sninda Shaha Chowdhury
 Mrinal Haldar
 Debjani Roy
 Dhritiman Chakrabarti
 Aboni Bhatercharjee
 Dibyendu Mukherjee
 Laboni Sarkar

Music

List of tracks

Awards
 Won - Indian Panorama at IFFI (1999)
 Won - National Film Awards (1999)

References

External links

 KSKP at ashokeviswanathan.com

1999 films
1999 drama films
Indian drama films
Films set in India
Films directed by Ashoke Viswanathan